Musa Bakare (born 24 June 1971) is a Nigerian swimmer. He competed in two events at the 1992 Summer Olympics.

References

External links
 

1971 births
Living people
Nigerian male swimmers
Olympic swimmers of Nigeria
Swimmers at the 1992 Summer Olympics
Place of birth missing (living people)
African Games medalists in swimming
Competitors at the 1991 All-Africa Games
African Games silver medalists for Nigeria
African Games bronze medalists for Nigeria
20th-century Nigerian people